In the Chinese common religion and philosophical schools the idea of the universal God has been expressed in a variety of names and representations, most notably as  ("Heaven") and  ("Highest Deity" or "Highest Emperor").

These two and other concepts have been variously combined, in diverse contexts, to form titles such as:
  ("Highest Heaven")
  ("Vault of Heaven").

The word  by itself has likewise been used for God.

When Abrahamic religions penetrated China, they appropriated some of the traditional titles, or created new compound titles, to express their theology.

General uses
Outside of direct translations in religious books, the following are often-encountered translations of the Abrahamic God in general usage.

Nestorian Christianity

The earliest introduction of documented Christian religion appears to be  (literally, "bright teaching") around 635 AD, whose proponents were Nestorian Christians from Persia. In a hymn supposed to be composed by Lü Dongbin, the Christian God is denominated by the term  (literally, "Lord of Heaven"), 800 years before Matteo Ricci and his companions.

Islam

Islam has enjoyed a long history in China. The term , from the Persian term for God, is seen more often in north-western China.

Catholicism

The earliest documented Chinese Roman Catholic church was founded in China in about 1289. The Roman Catholic Church historically favored  (literally "Heavenly Lord" or "Lord of Heaven"), and so "Catholicism" is most commonly rendered  (+ , "teach"), although among Chinese Catholics the literal translation of "catholic",  ("universal" + ), is also used. Korean and Vietnamese Catholics also use cognates of the term  for God. This appears to have been used by the Catholic Church to separate Confucian traditions, which were reported to worship spirits and therefore were incompatible with the exclusive biblical worship of God. Ironically, although versions of popular Confucianism became strongly associated with idol worship, traditionalists, notably the Kangxi Emperor, did not believe that such idolization accurately reflected Confucius's intent; Matteo Ricci also considered Confucius to be a philosopher rather than the founder of a religion.

Protestantism

The earliest Protestant missionary to China, Robert Morrison, arrived there in 1807. Before this time, Bibles were not printed for distribution. Their translators, coming to China later and separately, chose to use the older terminology , apparently believing  was a valid or preferable representation of the "Most High God".

Translations

A number of terms for "God" exist in the Christian Bible. For example, the first occurrence of a term for God in the Bible is in Genesis 1:1 and is rendered in the English as "God". However, many other titles (such as  – usually capitalized, as a replacement for the tetragrammaton – Almighty, etc.) are also used.

God
This term is much more generic, meaning god, God, spirit, or soul. This probably appeals to groups who are not committed to interpreting the term  as a historical or spiritual equivalent to the "God Most High" of the Bible. The issue has remained controversial for over a century and Protestant organizations have published two versions of the Bible, using the two different words.

Tetragrammaton
In addition, the Tetragrammaton, a four letter pronunciation of the name of God from the original Hebrew, often rendered as "YHWH", is rendered in different ways. Catholics have translated this into  (literally "Elegant Powerful," cf. English "Yahweh"). English "Jehovah"). Catholics, Anglicans, and Lutherans particularly use  in prayers of the Eucharist.

Lord
The term  (literally "Lord") is used by both Catholics and traditional Protestants in less formal prayers, and usually by contemporary Protestants.

Other less formal terms are used, for example,  (literally "Heavenly Father").

See also

 Christianity in China
 Catholicism in China
 Protestantism in China
 Chinese Rites controversy
 Chinese Christian theology
 History of the Jews in China
 Islam in China
 Tian

References

External links
 Example - notice how Shen and Shangti (shangdi) alternatives are offered at the top of the page.

Names of God
Christianity in China
Chinese words and phrases